Psychopathic Murder Mix Volume 2 is a remix album by Mike E. Clark. Released on November 9, 2010
, it features mashups and remixes of songs by Insane Clown Posse, Twiztid, Jamie Madrox, Boondox, Three 6 Mafia, Samhain Witch Killers, and Blaze Ya Dead Homie. It also features appearances by Tone Tone, Kottonmouth Kings, and Bootleg of The Dayton Family.

Production
Psychopathic Murder Mix Volume 2 was created, recorded, performed, produced, and mixed in the Funhouse Studio by Mike E. Clark. The album is made up of eleven remixes, three mashups, and one cover song performed by Mike E. Clark, all but one from which the original versions were produced by Clark, as well as three original tracks.

Track listing

Samples
My Posse Is On Broadway (Remix)
 "Red Mist" by Boondox from The Harvest
Killer Wicked Witch Wig Splitter (Remix)
 "Pull Me Over" by Shaggy 2 Dope from F.T.F.O.
Headless Zombie Boogie (Mash-Up)
 "Boogie Woogie Wu'" by Insane Clown Posse from The Great Milenko
Toast To The Fam (Remix)
 "Sippin'" by Boondox from The Harvest
Outro
 "Fuck the World" by Insane Clown Posse from The Amazing Jeckel Brothers

References

Albums produced by Mike E. Clark
2010 remix albums
Psychopathic Records remix albums